Christmas FM is a seasonal radio station based in the Republic of Ireland dedicated to Christmas-themed music, billed as "Ireland's Christmas Station". Airing during the Christmas season, it is a temporary licensed station, traditionally broadcasting from 28 November until 27 December since 2008. The station streams over the internet and maintains social media presence.

History
It began broadcasting in Dublin in 2008. Cork was added in 2009. Limerick, Galway and the South East of Ireland were added in 2010. With the inclusion of an additional transmitter, Kildare was added in 2011 and 2012. In 2013, transmitters were added in the North Midlands, in the North East and in North Wicklow.

In 2018 the station broadcast network was in Sligo 95.0, Dublin 105.2, Cork 106.7, Galway 87.7, Naas 88.1, South East 103.8, Nth East 99.4, Nth Midlands 101.6, Kilkenny 104.3, Wicklow 106.6, Nth Wicklow 99.5, Limerick 105.5, Ennis/Clare 105.2, Letterkenny 105.7, Kllarney/Tralee 105.0.

The format is music driven with the addition of Christmas-themed content, billed as trying to bring the 'Magic of Christmas'. As a temporary licensed station it does not carry commercial advertising but does have both on-air and online sponsors to cover operational costs each year.

Dunnes Stores and Cadbury were the main sponsors of the station for 2017, and in 2018 Coca-Cola joined these two main sponsors.

Charity work
The station has chosen charity partners in each of its broadcast years with the objective of raising awareness and funds for the partner. Funds are raised through a mixture of premium SMS, on-line and in-branch donation. 100% of listener donations go directly to the chosen charity. Charity partners are listed below:

2008: ISPCC, raising €35,000
2009: Simon Communities Dublin and Cork, raising €70,000
2010: Barnardos, raising €86,000
2011: Focus Ireland, raising €117,000
2012: ISPCC/Childline, raising €100,000
2013: Aware raising €85,000
2014: Age Action, raising €107,000
2015: Make-A-Wish Foundation, raising €278,000
2016: Focus Ireland, raising €365,000
2017: Sightsavers Ireland, raising €214,000
2018: Temple Street Children's University Hospital, raising €404,551
2019: Barretstown, raising €412,021 
2020: ALONE, raising €284,000
2021: Barnardos raising €331.515 
2022: The Magic of Christmas Initiative - Barnardos, Barretstown, Make-A-Wish Foundation, & The Communtiy Foundation for Ireland  

Christmas FM also operates a song competition in the run up to the broadcast period with the short list being aired for a listener voted winner to be selected.

Previous Winners from the Christmas FM Song Contest 

 2022: MULLED - A Perfect Christmas
 2021: Phil Redmond - Home for Christmas 
 2020: The Ivy Sisters - Mele Kalikimaka
 2019: Niall Teague - Santa Claus
 2018: Mark Leen - Fly Home for Christmas
 2017: Aisling and Maeve - This Christmas
 2016: Malcolm Lally - Christmas Time
 2015: Celtic Chique - Ireland in my Heart
 2014: Monster Monster - Christmas in Liverpool
 2013: Showstoppers - CHRISTMAS
 2012: The Henry Girls -  Mr. Snowman
 2011: [Unknown]
 2010: Snow Business - Christmas Time
 2009: Funzo - This Christmas
 2008: [First on air no-song contest]

Online stations
Christmas FM also operates four online-only Christmas themed music stations: Classical Christmas FM, Christmas FM North Pole and Christmas FM UK.

Staff
The station is staffed by approximately 100 volunteers and provides a 24-hour service during the license period. The voice-over used in many of Christmas FM's charity promotional appeals since 2008 belonged to Bob Gallico (1930–2013).

The founders of the station were Paul Shepard, Walter Hegarty, Garvan Rigby and Daragh O'Sullivan. It was conceived by Garvan Rigby. All had previous experience in pirate radio and in temporary licensed stations, with the first two having been among the principals of temporary licensed Premier FM. The first station manager was the late Jim Kenny. Chris Maher, an expert in soul music, did a stint as station manager. The current station manager is Dan McDermott, who occasionally presents on Christmas FM, but is best known as a presenter on alternative-oriented online station 8Radio.com.

References

External links

Christmas in the Republic of Ireland
Radio stations in the Republic of Ireland